Robert Torrens (1810 – 23 December 1874) was an Irish Conservative politician.

He was elected as the Member of Parliament (MP) for Carrickfergus at the 1859 general election and held the seat until the 1868 general election.

References

External links
 

1810 births
1874 deaths
Irish Conservative Party MPs
Members of the Parliament of the United Kingdom for County Antrim constituencies (1801–1922)
UK MPs 1859–1865
UK MPs 1865–1868